The Williamsport Bureau of Police or (WBP)  is the police agency responsible for law enforcement and investigations within the City of Williamsport, Pennsylvania, the county seat of Lycoming County. The Williamsport PD is the oldest police department in Lycoming county and Central Pennsylvania (even preceding the Pennsylvania State Police). As of 2013 there was about 80 active sworn police officers on the force.

History

The WPD was formed in 1850, Samuel B. Coder was the then-Borough of Williamsport's first police man. Samuel Coder appears to have served in this capacity until the time that Williamsport was incorporated as a city in 1866.  The City of Williamsport’s was incorporation on January 15, 1866, with city government organizing through the winter months and into the spring of 1866.  Maj. James M. Wood was elected as the city’s first mayor in May 1866. Corresponding changes in city government became necessary so two bodies of councils were formed and it was decided that a regular police force was needed.  The appointment of a regular police force was authorized by an Act of Assembly on March 21, 1867 and on June 4, 1866 Chief of Police Alexander M. McFadden was appointed with Samuel B. Coder, Appolos W. Grafius, and George W. Wilkinson all serving as police officers.

In the 145-year history of the city involving dedicated and professional public service to the City of Williamsport by more than 500 Officers who have donned the uniform.

Ranks within the department

Vehicles
1 2010 Crown Victoria Interceptor
1 4x4 Ford F-450 Ambulance (Crime Scene Unit)
5 Police Interceptor Utility SUV
1 Chevrolet Express Van (Used has transport vehicle)
5 2011 Ford Police Interceptor

Branches
Crime Scene Unit/Forensics
Police Patrol Division
Criminal Investigation Division
K-9
Special Response Team
School Resource Officer

Controversy

Homicide by vehicle 
In 2014, a Williamsport police officer named Jonathan Deprenda was traveling at 88 miles an hour when his cruiser collided with another car killing a man. State and Williamsport police say Deprenda was on his way to help another cop in a Police chase when he collided with another vehicle causing the other vehicle to catch fire. Officer Deprenda drove almost three times the posted 35 mile an hour speed limit. Later that year the officer was found guilty of homicide by vehicle and Involuntary manslaughter.

See also 
 Lycoming County Sheriff's Office
 Law enforcement in Pennsylvania

References

Municipal police departments of Pennsylvania